Danylo Oleksandrovych Hetmantsev (born April 26, 1978) is a Ukrainian politician and a Member of the Verkhovna Rada of pro-Russian views, gambling tycoon, Chairman of the Parliament Committee on Finance, Tax and Customs Policy. He has populist and regressive economic views.

Biography 
In 1995, Hetmantsev graduated from the Ukrainian Humanities Lyceum of Taras Shevchenko National University of Kyiv (KNU). In 2000 he obtained diploma with honors at the Faculty of Law of KNU.

Hetmantsev, being a 19-year-old student, together with his acquaintances founded the MolodSportLoto company (MSL) as an alternative to the state monopoly in the gambling business.

In the parliamentary elections of 2019, he was included in the list of the party "Servant of the People" under №20.

In the summer of 2019, during the parliamentary elections, he called for the restoration of water supply from mainland Ukraine to Crimea, annexed by Russia in 2014.

Drafting of bills 
One of the participants of drafting:

 the bills №-5153 and 5156, which were to deprive Ukrainian citizens (except MPs and state officials) of the right to keep cash outside the banks; to put the funds to the bank account, citizens were to pay a tax of 5%, regardless of whether the taxes have already been paid for obtaining those particular funds before or not;
 the normative act on raising the VAT rate from 20 to 24%;
 the bill № 4184, which, in particular, will oblige Internet giant companies operating in Ukraine to pay additional VAT to the Ukrainian state budget;
 the bill № 5600, which significantly increases tax rates on the sale of land and housing; increases land tax.

Submitted the bill № 4528, which proposed to abolish fines for refusing to provide services in Ukrainian language;

Author of the bill № 466 (№ 1210) "On Amendments to the Tax Code of Ukraine to Improve Tax Administration, Eliminate Technical and Logical Inconsistencies in Tax Legislation", which introduces total fiscalization of private entrepreneurs (PE). The bill was called “Tax terror” by Save PE activists.

Submitted a bill № 6562 (together with David Arahamia), which abolishes imposing the tariff on bitumen produced in Russia.

Economic views and initiatives 
On December 19, 2019, Hetmantsev, the Chairman of the Parliament Committee on Finance, Banking, Tax and Customs Policy, initiated a draft bill № 2634 (also known as “Google tax”), according to which Google, Facebook and Youtube had to pay 20% VAT to Ukrainian state budget. As a result, the cost of services to consumers increased by 20%.

In 2020-2021 Hetmantsev initiated imposing the obligation to use cash register devices on all private entrepreneurs of the 1st and 2nd groups, which provoked mass protests among members of these groups. On January 1, 2022, the reform came into force. Hetmantsev explained the protests by the reluctance of "smugglers and converters" to lose the earnings they received from tax evasion.

Hetmantsev violated a memorandum with the International Monetary Fund, which stipulates that Ukraine refuses to replace the income tax with a tax on withdrawn capital. Later on, he urged publicity not to jump to conclusions and announced changes to the reform.

Hetmantsev fiercely advocates restricting private entrepreneurs of the 3rd group from cooperating with legal entities for the sake of the so-called "fight against the shadow economy"; favoures the introduction of VAT on buying apartments in new buildings, explaining it this way: “when buying milk, Ukrainians also pay VAT and it does not shock them."

Hetmantsev believes that the legislation of Ukraine is imperfect, and due to this, citizens have managed to be accumulating funds without state control for 30 years.

In 2019, he proposed banning private entrepreneurs from providing services, but instead allowing them to perform only trade and production activities. According to Hetmantsev, this measure can help combat tax evasion.

As the founder of some gambling businesses, Hetmantsev supports the reduction of casino and gambling taxes.

In May 2022, Hetmantsev stated that he considered it appropriate to resume tax audits of businesses not affected by the war, and raise taxes, as well as introduce many subsidies for different types of businesses.

Pro-Russian views 
According to the investigations of Ukrainian journalist and special services, Hetmantsev often quotes and supports messages of Russian Telegram-channels, along with pro-Russian politician from "Servants of the People" Maksym Buzhanskyi and host of the banned pro-Russian TV channel NASH Maksym Nazarov. For example, Hetmantsev supported the Kremlin's Telegram channel, which worked for the Kremlin and spread fakes about the "capture of Kyiv and Mykolayiv" on February 24, 2022.

Opposes the de-Russification of Ukrainian streets, in particular, the renaming of streets named after the writers of the Russian Empire Pushkin, Tolstoy and others.

The day before Russia's full-scale invasion of Ukraine on February 23, 2022, Hetmantsev proposed "choosing math over patriotism," calling for active trade with Russia, and saying that European and US sanctions against Russia were ineffective.

He believes that the Ukrainian Institute of National Memory honors Nazism, and therefore its funding should be reduced.

He believes that Ukraine in 2021 has not reached the level of GDP of the Ukrainian SSR, although economists point out that Ukraine after 2016 has much higher GDP and key welfare of Ukrainians than in the Ukrainian SSR, even despite the war with Russia in 2014.

References 

1978 births
Politicians from Kyiv
University of Kyiv, Law faculty alumni
Academic staff of the Taras Shevchenko National University of Kyiv
Ninth convocation members of the Verkhovna Rada
21st-century Ukrainian politicians
Living people
Servant of the People (political party) politicians